The mixed relay competition of the 2022 Winter Olympics was held on 5 February, at the National Biathlon Centre, in the Zhangjiakou cluster of competition venues,  north of Beijing, at an elevation of . The event was won by Norway. France was second, and the Russian Olympic Committee third.

Summary
The defending champions were France, and the 2018 silver and bronze medalists were Norway and Italy, respectively. There was only one mixed relay in the 2021–22 Biathlon World Cup before the Olympics, won by Norway, with Belarus second and France third. Norway were also the 2021 world champion.

Marte Olsbu Røiseland comfortably won the first leg for Norway, who was 15 seconds ahead of Italy, followed by Belarus, Sweden, and the Russian Olympic Committee. For France, Anaïs Chevalier-Bouchet had to ski two penalty loops and was in the ninth position. However, in the second leg Norway's Tiril Eckhoff got three penalty loops and dropped to the fifth position. Julia Simon brought France to the leading position after the second leg, 4 seconds ahead of Italy, fifteen ahead of Sweden, and 30 seconds ahead of the United States and Norway. Meanwhile, Kristina Reztsova had to ski a penalty loop on her leg, and the Russian Olympic Committee dropped to seventh, a minute behind France. Alexander Loginov was the fastest in the third leg, bringing the Russian Olympic Committee to the leading position. Sweden was second, France dropped to third due to Émilien Jacquelin being on the penalty loop twice on his standing shoot. The United States were still fourth, and Norway fifth, all four teams approximately 20 seconds behind the leader. Italy dropped to seventh after a  penalty loop of Thomas Bormolini and was not able to return to medal contention. On the last leg Quentin Fillon Maillet caught up with Eduard Latypov and Johannes Thingnes Bø caught over 9 seconds. At the finish Bø outsprinted Fillon Maillet and Latypov, and Norway won the gold medal ahead of France and the Russia Olympic Committee.

Qualification

Results
The race was started at 17:00.

References

 Biathlon at the 2022 Winter Olympics
Mixed events at the 2022 Winter Olympics